Gorodetsky District is an administrative district (raion), one of the forty in Nizhny Novgorod Oblast, Russia. Municipally, it is incorporated as Gorodetsky Municipal District. It is located in the west of the oblast. Its administrative center is the town of Gorodets. Population: 91,577 (2010 Census);  The population of Gorodets accounts for 33.5% of the district's total population.

History
The district was established in 1929.

Notable residents 

Alexander Semyonovich Vedernikov (1898–1975), artist

References

Notes

Sources

Districts of Nizhny Novgorod Oblast
States and territories established in 1929
 
